Raymond Lévesque (October 7, 1928 – February 15, 2021) was a Canadian singer-songwriter and poet from Quebec. One of the pioneers of the chansonnier tradition in Quebec, he was best known for writing "Quand les hommes vivront d'amour", one of the most famous pop standards in French-language popular music.

Early life
Lévesque was born in Montreal on October 7, 1928. He learned piano under Rodolphe Mathieu and drama under Madame Audet. Shortly after, he met his wife and they married soon after. Inspired by the work of Charles Trenet, he began writing songs in the 1940s and started performing in various cabarets around Montreal. He had his first significant breakthrough in 1947, when he was invited to perform several of his songs on CKAC radio by Fernand Robidoux.

Career
Lévesque was cohost with Colette Bonheur of the variety series Mes jeunes années on Radio-Canada from 1952 to 1954. He subsequently spent several years living in France, where he recorded for Barclay Records and had his songs recorded by French artists such as Bourvil, Jean Sablon, Cora Vaucaire and Eddie Constantine. During this time he wrote "Quand les hommes vivront d'amour", which was inspired by the contemporaneous Algerian War; first recorded by Constantine, the song has since been recorded and performed by many artists in both France and Canada. Other noted songs he wrote during this era included "Les Trottoirs", "La Vénus à Mimile", "Le Coeur du Bon Dieu" and "Rosemont sous la pluie".

After returning to Quebec in 1959, he took acting roles in several téléromans and hosted the children's television series Coucou, and cofounded a boîte à chansons called Chez Bozo with Jean-Pierre Ferland, Clémence DesRochers, Hervé Brousseau, André Gagnon and Claude Léveillée. In 1968, he also began to write poetry and plays, and became politically active in the Quebec separatist movement.

Later life
Lévesque received a lifetime achievement award from the Prix Félix in 1980. By the mid-1980s, Lévesque had suffered profound hearing loss and was diagnosed as deaf. He abandoned music but continued to write, publishing several further works of poetry, fiction and political satire.

Lévesque was awarded the Prix Denise-Pelletier in 1997. He was named a winner of the Governor General's Performing Arts Award in 2005, but declined the honour due to his sovereignist views.

In 2016, a new song written by Lévesque, titled "Les jours d'amour", was recorded and released by singer Marie-Josée Longchamps. He died on February 15, 2021, in Montreal. He was 92, and had been diagnosed with COVID-19 during the COVID-19 pandemic in Quebec in the time leading up to his death.

Discography

Albums 
 1962 – Chansons et monologues
 1965 – Raymond Lévesque à la Butte-à-Mathieu
 1967 – Après 20 ans
 1971 – Raymond Lévesque
 1972 – Qui êtes-vous, Raymond Lévesque?
 1975 – Raymond Lévesque chante pour les travailleurs
 1977 – Le p'tit Québec de mon cœur

Compilations 
 1989 – Collection souvenir
 1993 – Québec love : Raymond Lévesque
 1999 – Raymond Lévesque : 50 ans de chansons – Quand les hommes vivront d'amour
 2005 – Raymond Lévesque – Collection Québec Info Musique

Bibliography

Poetry 
 1956 – Quand les hommes vivront d'amour
 1971 – Au fond du chaos
 1971 – Le malheur n`a pas des bons yeux
 1974 – On veut rien savoir
 1977 – Le Temps de parler
 1981 – Électrochoc
 1989 – Quand les hommes vivront d'amour II
 2012 – La nouvelle pensée

Plays 
•  1968-Médée 
 1970 – Bigaouette
 1974 – Tharèse
 1980 – On veut savoir
 1983 – C'est à ton tour mon cher René
 1986 – Waitress
 1988 – Deux mille ans après Jésus-Christ

Autobiography
 1986 – D'ailleurs et d'ici

Novels
 1995 – Ketchup : ou comment refaire le monde
 2000 – Le petit Lalonde

References

External links
 
 

1928 births
2021 deaths
Canadian folk singer-songwriters
French-language singers of Canada
20th-century Canadian poets
20th-century Canadian dramatists and playwrights
21st-century Canadian novelists
Canadian male poets
Canadian male dramatists and playwrights
Canadian musical theatre composers
Canadian autobiographers
Canadian humorists
Canadian novelists in French
Canadian poets in French
Canadian dramatists and playwrights in French
Singers from Montreal
Writers from Montreal
20th-century Canadian male singers
French Quebecers
Canadian male television actors
Canadian television variety show hosts
Canadian male novelists
20th-century Canadian male writers
21st-century Canadian male writers
Canadian male non-fiction writers
Prix Denise-Pelletier winners
Félix Award winners
Deaths from the COVID-19 pandemic in Canada